State Highway 132 (SH 132) is a state highway in Texas, United States, running  between Devine and Lytle. It follows a former alignment of U.S. Highway 81 (US 81), which was bypassed by the parallel Interstate 35 (I‑35). SH 132 was established in 1991, when US 81 was truncated to Fort Worth.

Route description
SH 132 begins at I‑35 exit 121, southwest of Devine. The highway runs through the town as Teel Drive, where it intersects SH 173 and begins an overlap with FM 463. The concurrency with FM 463 ends just northeast of Medina County Road 772. SH 132 enters the town of Natalia where it has a short overlap with FM 471; in Natalia, the highway is known as 2nd Street. After leaving the city limits of Natalia, SH 132 crosses into Atascosa County. The highway enters the town of Lytle where it is known as Main Street. SH 132 has a brief overlap with FM 2790 before entering Bexar County and ending at I‑35 exit 133.

History
 SH 132 was originally proposed on April 25, 1928, as a route from Livingston to Liberty. On September 22, 1932, this route became a portion of SH 146 (which was extended from Dayton to Cleveland on August 3 of that year, but there was a lack of funding, but this road was restored as SH 321 on October 30, 1939).

The current highway was designated on March 26, 1991, to replace US 81, which was decommissioned south of Fort Worth.

Junction list

References

U.S. Route 81
132
Transportation in Medina County, Texas
Transportation in Atascosa County, Texas
Transportation in Bexar County, Texas